Teleiopsis tchukotka is a moth of the family Gelechiidae. It is found in the Russian Far East, where it has been recorded from the Chukotka Autonomous Okrug.

References

Moths described in 2012
Teleiopsis